State Highway 237 (SH 237) is a state highway in the U.S. state of Texas that runs from near La Grange northeast to US 290 near Carmine.

Route description
SH 237 begins at SH 159 near Oldenburg, northeast of La Grange. It takes a northeasterly path through rural Fayette County, intersecting FM 1291 and FM 954, before entering the town of Round Top, where it intersects FM 1457. Near the Washington County line, Spur 458, a former routing of US 290, provides a connection to Carmine. After entering Washington County, SH 237 ends at US 290, with northbound SH 237 traffic merging onto eastbound US 290 toward Brenham.

History
SH 237 was designated on December 22, 1936 as a renumbering of SH 128 (which replaced this section of SH 72 on November 24, 1936) to avoid confusion with the recently-cancelled SH 128. On September 26, 1939, the section southwest of SH 159 was transferred to SH 159.

Junction list

References

237
Transportation in Fayette County, Texas
Transportation in Washington County, Texas